Minyons de Terrassa is a group of castellers from Terrassa  and publicly presented on 14 July 1979.

On 22 November 2015, they became the first group ever to successfully complete and dismantle a 4 de 10 amb folre i manilles.

References

External links

Terrassa
Castellers
Catalan folklore